Mount Morris is an unincorporated community in the town of Mount Morris in Waushara County, Wisconsin, United States. It is located at the intersection of Wisconsin Highway 152 with County roads W and G. Mount Morris rises approximately 200 feet above the northeast side of the community and Lake Morris lays along the southwest side.

References

Unincorporated communities in Waushara County, Wisconsin
Unincorporated communities in Wisconsin